Phrenic vein may refer to:

 Inferior phrenic vein
 Superior phrenic vein